Jean de la Croix Ipirina (born  1953) is a Malagasy politician. He is a member of the Senate of Madagascar for Analanjirofo, and is a member of the Tiako I Madagasikara party.

See also
Politics of Madagascar

References

1950s births
Living people
Year of birth uncertain
Members of the Senate (Madagascar)
Tiako I Madagasikara politicians
Place of birth missing (living people)